Neufchelles is a commune in the Oise department in northern France. It is located 66 km north east of Paris and 40 km south east of Senlis.

See also
Communes of the Oise department

References

Communes of Oise